Best O' Boingo is the second greatest hits album from American new wave band Oingo Boingo, released in 1991 by MCA Records. It features songs recorded during the band's years on MCA Records, from 1984's So-Lo through 1990's Dark at the End of the Tunnel. As such, the songs from the period when the band was on I.R.S. Records—as well as several others—are represented here by their re-recorded versions from the 1988 "live in the studio" album Boingo Alive.

Track listing

Personnel

Oingo Boingo
John Avila – bass guitar, vocals
Steve Bartek – guitars
Danny Elfman – vocals, rhythm guitars
Carl Graves – keyboards, vocals
Johnny "Vatos" Hernandez – drums, percussion
Sam Phipps – tenor and soprano saxophones
Leon Schneiderman – baritone saxophone
Dale Turner – trumpet, trombone

Additional musicians
Bruce Fowler – trombone
Mike Bacich – keyboards (tracks 7, 11)

Technical
Danny Elfman – co-producer (tracks 1–17)
Steve Bartek – co-producer (tracks 1–17)
John Avila – co-producer (tracks 1–2, 4–17)
Paul Ratajczak – co-producer (track 3)
Bill Jackson – engineer, mixing (tracks 1, 6, 9, 13–14, 16–17)
Mark Camins – mixing (track 3)
Jay Burnett – mixing (track 3)
Chris Lord-Alge – mixing (tracks 2, 4–5, 10)
Jim Scott – mixing (tracks 8, 12, 15)
David Leonard – mixing (track 11)
Michael Frondelli – mixing (track 7)
Vartan – art direction
Sunja Park – design
Georganne Deen – cover art, logo

References 

1991 greatest hits albums
Oingo Boingo compilation albums
Albums produced by Steve Bartek
MCA Records compilation albums